Newell Simon Hall is in the northwestern part of the Carnegie Mellon campus named after the late Herbert A. Simon and Allen Newell.  It was built atop two earlier buildings (Buildings C and D) acquired from the United States Bureau of Mines.

References

Carnegie Mellon University